Chen Chu (1917–1996) was a Chinese diplomat. He was born in Rongcheng, Shandong. He was the first ambassador of the People's Republic of China to Japan (1973–1976) and Permanent Representative of China to the United Nations (1977–1980).

His son, Chen Xiaogong, was a lieutenant general who served as deputy commander of the People's Liberation Army Air Force.

References

1917 births
1996 deaths
Ambassadors of China to Japan
Permanent Representatives of the People's Republic of China to the United Nations
People from Weihai